Dale Thomas Mortensen (February 2, 1939 – January 9, 2014) was an American economist and winner of the Nobel Memorial Prize in Economic Sciences.

Early life and education
Mortensen was born in Enterprise, Oregon. He received his BA in economics from Willamette University and his PhD in Economics from Carnegie Mellon University.

Career

Mortensen had been on the faculty of Northwestern University since 1965 and a professor of Managerial Economics and Decision Sciences at the Kellogg School of Management since 1980. He was  the Niels Bohr Visiting Professor at the School of Economics and Management, Aarhus University, from 2006 to 2010.

He was awarded the Nobel Memorial Prize in Economic Sciences jointly  with Christopher A. Pissarides from the London School of Economics and Peter A. Diamond from the Massachusetts Institute of Technology in 2010 "for their analysis of markets with search frictions". In May 2011, Mortensen was awarded an honorary doctorate from his alma mater, Willamette University. He was married to Beverly Mortensen, also a Northwestern Professor.

Mortensen's research focused on labor economics, macroeconomics and economic theory.  He is especially known for his pioneering work on the search and matching theory of frictional unemployment.  He extended the insights from this work to study labor turnover and reallocation, research and development, and personal relationships.

Mortensen was a past president of the Society of Economic Dynamics and one of the founding editors of the Review of Economic Dynamics.

Death
Mortensen died of stage 4 lung cancer on January 9, 2014, at the age of 74, at his home in Wilmette.

Awards, fellowships
 Alexander Henderson Award, 1965
 Fellow, Econometric Society, 1979
 Fellow, American Academy of Arts and Sciences, 2000
 IZA Prize in Labor Economics, 2005
 Nobel Prize in Economics, 2010; joint with Christopher A. Pissarides and Peter A. Diamond

The Dale T. Mortensen Building
In February 2011, Mortensen had a building named in his honor at Aarhus University. The Dale T. Mortensen Building is the central hub for all international and PhD activities and contains the new PhD House, Dale's Café, the university's International Centre and the new IC Dormitory for international PhD students.

Selected publications
 D. Mortensen and E. Nagypál (2007), 'More on unemployment and vacancy fluctuations.' Review of Economic Dynamics 10 (3), pp. 327–47.
  D. Mortensen (2005), Wage Dispersion: Why Are Similar Workers Paid Differently?, MIT Press.   
 K. Burdett and D. Mortensen (1998), 'Wage differentials, employer size, and unemployment.' International Economic Review 39, pp. 257–73.
 D. Mortensen and C. Pissarides (1994), 'Job creation and job destruction in the theory of unemployment.' Review of Economic Studies 61, pp. 397–415.
 D. Mortensen (1986), 'Job search and labor market analysis.' Ch. 15 of Handbook of Labor Economics, vol. 2, O. Ashenfelter and R. Layard, eds., North-Holland.
 D. Mortensen (1982), 'Property rights and efficiency of mating, racing, and related games.' American Economic Review 72 (5), pp. 968–79.
 D. Mortensen (1982), 'The matching process as a non-cooperative/bargaining game.' In The Economics of Information and Uncertainty, J. McCall, ed., NBER, .
 D. Mortensen (1972), 'A theory of wage and employment dynamics.' In Microeconomic Foundations of Employment and Inflation Theory, E. Phelps et al., eds., Norton,

References

External links
 
 Dale T. Mortensen official site
 Dale Mortensen at School of Economics and Management at Aarhus University
  including the Nobel lecture Markets with Search Frictions and the DMP Model
 

1939 births
2014 deaths
Labor economists
Fellows of the Econometric Society
Willamette University alumni
Kellogg School of Management faculty
Nobel laureates in Economics
People from Enterprise, Oregon
Carnegie Mellon University alumni
20th-century American writers
21st-century American non-fiction writers
20th-century American economists
21st-century American economists
Distinguished Fellows of the American Economic Association
National Bureau of Economic Research
Economists from Oregon